The 2017 Lamar Hunt U.S. Open Cup tournament proper will feature teams from all five tiers of men's soccer of the American Soccer Pyramid. A record 64 amateur teams have entered qualifying this year.

As with the 2016 tournament, US Soccer now oversees the qualifying process that used to be handled by each association. According to US Soccer, all teams within the Division I & II professional leagues will qualify automatically as in past years. Any Open Division national league can apply to use previous year's league standings as their qualification method. Remaining Open Division teams will participate in up to five qualifying rounds to determine entrants into the tournament proper. Final slot allocation will be determined when team registration has concluded.

National League Track

Premier Development League (21 teams)

Twenty-one teams entered through the Premier Development League. Nine division winners, followed by 12 at large berths.

National Premier Soccer League (18 teams)

Playoffs
AFC Cleveland (OH)
Albion SC Pros (CA)
Chattanooga FC (TN)
Clarkstown SC Eagles (NY)
Grand Rapids FC (MI)
Miami United FC (FL)
New Jersey Copa FC (NJ)
Sonoma County Sol (CA)

At-Large Berths
AFC Ann Arbor (MI)
Atlanta Silverbacks (GA)
Boston City FC (MA)
Dutch Lions FC (TX)
FC Wichita (KS)
Fredericksburg FC (VA)
Jacksonville Armada U-23 (FL)
Legacy 76 (VA)
OSA FC (WA)
Tulsa Athletics (OK)

Local Qualifying Track

First qualifying round
First round games took place in 2016.

Second qualifying round
Second round games took place in 2016. All winners qualified for the tournament proper.

References

External links
 U.S. Soccer Federation
 TheCup.us - Unofficial U.S. Open Cup News

U.S. Open Cup